is a Japanese manga series written by Ume Matsutake and illustrated by Lee Brocco. It was serialized in Square Enix's seinen manga magazine Young Gangan from January 2019 to September 2021, with its chapters collected in six tankōbon volumes.

Publication
Written by Ume Matsutake and illustrated by Lee Brocco, Gokudō Parasites was serialized in Square Enix's seinen manga magazine Young Gangan from January 18, 2019, to September 3, 2021. Square Enix collected its chapters in six tankōbon volumes, released from August 24, 2019, to November 25, 2021.

Volume list

References

External links
 

Comedy anime and manga
Gangan Comics manga
Seinen manga